Raymond W. Gruender (born July 5, 1963) is a United States circuit judge of the United States Court of Appeals for the Eighth Circuit.

Education and early career 
Gruender was born in St. Louis, Missouri. He graduated from the prestigious Jesuit, all-boy college College-preparatory school, St. Louis University High School, in 1981. He then attended Washington University in St. Louis and Washington University School of Law and earned three degrees: a Bachelor of Arts, a Juris Doctor, and a Master of Business Administration. In 2006, he received the Distinguished Young Alumni Award from the law school.

Prior to joining the federal bench, Gruender worked as an attorney both in private practice and public service. After law school, he was in private practice at Lewis, Rice & Fingersh from 1987 to 1990, at which point he became an Assistant United States Attorney for the Eastern District of Missouri. In 1994, he ran for election as St. Louis County Prosecuting Attorney and lost to the incumbent. He then returned to private practice at Thompson Coburn. In 1996, he was the Missouri state campaign director for Bob Dole's president campaign. In 2000, he left Thompson Coburn to rejoin the United States Attorneys' Office, and in 2001 he became the United States Attorney for the Eastern District of Missouri, a position he remained in until his confirmation to the Eighth Circuit in 2004.

Federal judicial service 
Gruender was nominated to the Eighth Circuit by President George W. Bush on September 29, 2003 to fill a seat vacated by Judge Pasco Bowman II. The United States Senate confirmed him almost eight months later on May 20, 2004 by a 97–1 vote, with the only vote against his confirmation coming from U.S. Senator Tom Harkin. Gruender received his commission on June 5, 2004.

Jurisprudence 

Gruender authored the Eighth Circuit's opinion in In Re Union Pacific Railroad Employment Practices Litigation, No. 06-1706, which concluded that the Pregnancy Discrimination Act of 1978 did not give female employees the right to insurance coverage for contraceptives used solely to prevent pregnancy. This opinion has been cited in the context of the debate over the Patient Protection and Affordable Care Act contraception mandate.

In Planned Parenthood Minnesota, North Dakota, South Dakota v. Rounds, No. 05-3093, a panel of the Eighth Circuit upheld an injunction that struck down a South Dakota informed consent law that required abortion providers to inform patients, among other things, that an "abortion will terminate the life of a whole, separate, unique, living human being."  Gruender dissented, arguing that the law was constitutional and did not unduly burden women seeking abortions or infringe on the freedom of speech of physicians.  The Eighth Circuit heard the case en banc and ruled in 2008 by a vote of 7–4, in an opinion authored by Gruender, that the law was, on its face, constitutional.

In Little Rock School District v. North Little Rock School District, No. 04-2923 (2006), Gruender opposed the opinion of a panel of the Eighth Circuit that affirmed the district court's conclusion that federal desegregation monitoring should remain in effect in Little Rock, Arkansas.  After the desegregation effort of the Little Rock Nine in 1957, the federal government began monitoring the school district in 1965.  The Eighth Circuit agreed with the district court that the Little Rock district did not successfully evaluate its academic programs for how well they helped black students.  Gruender dissented, arguing that the district court abused its discretion in mandating federal monitoring by using "impossibly subjective" criteria.  The district court subsequently agreed with Gruender's reasoning and freed the school district from federal desegregation monitoring.  In 2009, the Eighth Circuit then upheld the district court's decision in another appeal, No. 07-1866.

Possible Supreme Court nomination 
Gruender has been consistently mentioned as a possible nominee for the Supreme Court in a Republican administration. On May 18, 2016, then Republican presidential candidate Donald Trump announced that Gruender was on his list of potential Supreme Court nominees.

See also 
Donald Trump Supreme Court candidates

References

External links
 

|-

1963 births
Living people
20th-century American lawyers
21st-century American lawyers
21st-century American judges
Assistant United States Attorneys
Federalist Society members
George W. Bush administration personnel
Judges of the United States Court of Appeals for the Eighth Circuit
Missouri lawyers
Olin Business School (Washington University) alumni
United States Attorneys for the Eastern District of Missouri
United States court of appeals judges appointed by George W. Bush
Washington University School of Law alumni
Washington University in St. Louis alumni